Pedicularis howellii is an uncommon species of flowering plant in the family Orobanchaceae known by the common name Howell's lousewort. It is endemic to the Siskiyou Mountains of the Klamath Range in southern Oregon and northern California, where it grows on the edges of coniferous forests. The basal leaves fall away early. The inflorescence is a small raceme of flowers occupying the top of the stem. The plant is pollinated by bumblebees including Bombus mixtus. Between the flowers are hairy to woolly triangular bracts. The fruit is a capsule just under a centimeter long containing seeds with netted surfaces.

The plant probably relies on an adequate amount of snow in the area to keep enough moisture in the soil for germination the following season.

References

External links
Jepson Manual Treatment
USDA Plants Profile
Photo gallery

howellii
Flora of California
Flora of Oregon
Flora of the Klamath Mountains
Endemic flora of the United States
Taxa named by Asa Gray
Flora without expected TNC conservation status